Aclytia gynamorpha is a moth of the family Erebidae. It was described by George Hampson in 1898. It is found in Peru, Costa Rica, French Guiana and the Brazilian states of Amazonas and Pará.

References

Moths described in 1898
Aclytia
Moths of Central America
Moths of South America